List of Orthodox Archbishops of Alba Iulia of the Metropolis of Transylvania, Romanian Patriarchate:

1975-1990: Emilian Birdaș
1990-2011: Andrei Andreicuț
din 2011: Irineu Pop

From 1921 to 1948, the Diocese of the Romanian Army was headquartered at Alba Iulia.

External links 
 Alba Iulia
Alba